This article is the discography of all the music produced by English glam rock band Mud.

Albums

Studio albums

Compilation albums

Singles

Notes

References 

Discographies of British artists
Rock music group discographies